This article lists the presidents of the Parliament of La Rioja, the regional legislature of La Rioja.

Presidents

References

La Rioja